Standing Still may refer to:

 "Standing Still" (Jewel song)
 "Standing Still" (Roman Lob song)
 Standing Still (film), a 2005 film starring Amy Adams

See also
 Still Standing (disambiguation)